The episcopal or pontifical blessing is a blessing imparted by a bishop, especially if using a formula given in official liturgical books.

The term is sometimes used of such a formula, rather than of an actual blessing.

Roman Catholic Church

Traditional formula 
The Roman Missal gives a formula for the episcopal or pontifical blessing at the end of Mass of the Roman Rite celebrated by a bishop: It consists of the regular liturgical greeting, two verses from the Psalms ( and ), each divided into two parts, and then the actual invocation.

The following is the formula, together with the introductory Dominus vobiscum:
In Missa pontificali celebrans accipit mitram et, extendens manus, dicit:
Dominus vobiscum.
Omnes respondent:
Et cum spiritu tuo.
Celebrans dicit:
Sit nomen Domini benedictum.
Omnes respondent:
Ex hoc nunc et usque in sæculum.
Celebrans dicit:
Adiutorium nostrum in nomine Domini.
Omnes respondent:
Qui fecit cælum et terram.
Tunc celebrans, accepto, si eo utitur, baculo, dicit:
Benedicat vos omnipotens Deus,
ter signum crucis super populum faciens, addit:
Pater, et Filius, et Spiritus Sanctus.
Omnes:
Amen.

The official English translation is:
In a Pontifical Mass, the celebrant receives the mitre and, extending his hands, says:
The Lord be with you.
All reply:
And with your spirit.
The celebrant says:
Blessed be the name of the Lord.
All reply:
Now and for ever.
The celebrant says:
Our help is in the name of the Lord.
All reply:
Who made heaven and earth.
Then the celebrant receives the pastoral staff, if he uses it, and says:
May almighty God bless you,
making the Sign of the Cross over the people three times, he adds:
the Father, and the Son, and the Holy Spirit.
All:
Amen.

Rather elaborate ceremonies have sometimes surrounded the imparting of a pontifical blessing, as indicated in Adrian Fortescue's The Ceremonies of the Roman Rite Described. It is somewhat simpler today.

Alternative formulae 

The Caeremoniale Episcoporum indicates that use of the above formula is not mandatory for a bishop even when celebrating a station Mass. He may also use other appropriate formulas given in the Roman Missal, Pontifical or Ritual, making the Sign of the Cross three times over the people.

Under the heading "Ordinary Blessing", the Caeremoniale Episcoporum gives two formulas for use in less solemn circumstances, such as at the end of Vespers or Lauds, at the close of a procession with the Blessed Sacrament, and even outside of liturgical celebrations. It gives the traditional formula in second place after a formula found also in the Roman Missal among the solemn blessings that even a priest may use at the end of Mass:
"Pax Dei, quae exsuperat omnem sensum, custodiat corda vestra et intellegentias vestras in scientia et caritate Dei et Filii eius Domini nostri Iesu Christi", followed by "Benedicat vos omnipotens Deus Pater, et Filius, et Spiritus Sanctus."
In English:
"May the peace of God, which surpasses all understanding, keep your hearts and minds in the knowledge and love of God, and of his Son, our Lord Jesus Christ", followed by "May almighty God bless you, the Father, and the Son, and the Holy Spirit."

Anglicanism 

In the Church of England, a pontifical blessing may be preceded by:

Our help is in the name of the Lord,
who has made heaven and earth.

Blessed be the name of the Lord,
now and for ever. Amen.

The pontifical blessing used in the Episcopal Church in the United States of America has been described as follows:

References 

Order of Mass